Aiton may refer to:

People
Aiton (surname)
Standard author abbreviation of William Aiton (1731 – 1793), Scottish botanist

Places
Aiton, Cluj, a commune in Romania
Aiton, Savoie, a commune in France

Other uses
Tai Aiton people, one of the Tai ethnic groups in India
Tai Aiton language, a language of Assam, India

See also
Ayton (disambiguation)
Aytoun